Proven Innocent is an American legal drama television series created by David Elliot, which premiered on February 15, 2019, on Fox. The series follows the employees of a wrongful conviction law firm and stars Rachelle Lefevre, Russell Hornsby, Nikki M. James, Vincent Kartheiser, Riley Smith, Kelsey Grammer, and Clare O'Connor. On May 11, 2019, Fox canceled the series after one season.

Cast and characters

Main
 Rachelle Lefevre as Madeline Scott, a lawyer specializing in wrongful convictions, driven by the experience of spending ten years in prison for the murder of her best friend Rosemary, even though she didn't commit it. She studied for pre-law while in prison and graduated Yale at the top of her class once she was released. She is sometimes prone to becoming overzealous in attempting to achieve her goals, but has made it clear more than once that she draws a line between 'not guilty' and 'innocent', constantly determined to prove her clients' innocence due to the challenges they would face if released under 'not guilty'. 
 Clare O'Connor as Young Madeline Scott
 Russell Hornsby as Ezekiel "EZ" Boudreau, a former reinsurance lawyer who got Madeline's conviction overturned and now works as a senior member of her firm. He was the 2,736th lawyer Madeline wrote to when trying to prove her innocence while in prison (based on the number at the bottom of the letter Madeline sent him). He is religious, but has shown a willingness to compromise his religious views in extreme cases; for example, while he objects to abortion, he agrees that a twenty-five-year sentence was too extreme for a mother accused of killing her baby.
 Nikki M. James as Violet Bell, the firm's media consultant and the host of a podcast. She often offers advice on how they might present a case to the public, based on countering Madeline's own experience when she was presented as a party girl after the death of Rosemary when that night was the first time Madeline drank at all.
 Vincent Kartheiser as Bodie Quick, the firm's chief investigator. He has shown a fondness for going undercover even when a simpler approach might be better and displays a wide range of skills.
 Riley Smith as Levi Scott, Madeline's brother struggles with an oxycodone addiction resulting from the trauma of imprisonment. Unlike his sister, he has struggled to move on from his conviction. 
 Kelsey Grammer as Gore Bellows, the Cook County state attorney, whose celebrated career has long been shadowed by allegations of multiple wrongful convictions, including those of Madeline and Levi Scott. He is generally shown as going for the easiest solution to cases even when alternatives are possible, preferring a quick and easy trial to more in-depth investigations, although he attempts to present himself as merely misguided or misinformed when Madeline's team proves him wrong, such as when they confirmed that one conviction was based on a translator deliberately doctoring the transcript of a preacher who didn't speak English to create the impression that the man claimed his wife never wanted children when Bellows sentenced her to prison for killing her child.

Recurring
 Elaine Hendrix as Susan Andrews, a high-profile reporter linked to the Bellows campaign.
 Laurie Holden as Greta Bellows, Gore's shrewish wife. She often encourages him to attack Madeline in his own campaign for attorney general, but Bellows resists this idea to avoid making Madeline's case a major issue. 
 Caitlin Mehner as Heather Husband (née Dupinski), a relative of Rosemary Lynch who believes in Madeline's guilt and derides her as a criminal, to the point that her husband deliberately provoked Levi into attacking him just to ruin Levi's chances of staying out of jail.
 Tembi Locke as Vanessa Dale
 Tiffany Dupont as Nikki Russo, a cop and Bodie's love interest from whom he occasionally solicits favors. They break up when Bodie uses evidence she gave him to take down a dirty cop, which she views as a breach of trust.
 Catherine Lidstone as Isabel Sanchez, a young, hungry prosecutor who views Bellows as a mentor. She is essentially a "counterpart" to Madeline as their lives were each ruined by a flawed court case, albeit from different sides; where Madeline was wrongfully convicted of a crime she did not commit, Sanchez's mother was killed by a man who was cleared of an assault charge just a month prior to her mother's death, with Bellows as the prosecuting attorney. 
 Candice Coke as Wren Grant, an inmate and Madeline's prison lesbian girlfriend.
 Jeffrey Nordling as Rick Zahn alias Ravi, cult leader and rapist, main donor to Bellows campaign

Episodes

Production

Development
On August 4, 2017, it was announced that Fox had given the production, then titled Infamy, a script plus penalty commitment. The pilot episode was written by David Elliot who is set to executive produce alongside Danny Strong and Stacy Greenberg. Production companies involved with the pilot include Danny Strong Productions and 20th Century Fox Television. On February 1, 2018, it was announced that Fox had given the production a pilot order. On May 9, 2018, it was announced that Fox had given the production, now titled Proven Innocent, a series order. A few days later, it was announced that the series would premiere in the spring of 2019 as a mid-season replacement. On October 29, 2018, it was announced that the series would premiere on February 15, 2019.

Casting
On February 21, 2018, it was announced that Russell Hornsby had been cast in the pilot's lead male role. In March 2018, it was reported that Rachelle Lefevre, Vincent Kartheiser, Riley Smith, Brian d’Arcy James, Clare O’Connor, and Nikki M. James had joined the main cast as series regulars. On June 1, 2018, it was announced that Kelsey Grammer had been cast to replace d'Arcy James in the role of Gore Bellows (previously Cole Bellows). In September 2018, it was reported that Elaine Hendrix and Laurie Holden had been cast in recurring roles. In October 2018, it was announced that Caitlin Mehner, Tembi Locke, Tiffany Dupont, and Catherine Lidstone had also joined the cast in a recurring capacity. On November 1, 2018, it was reported that Candice Coke had been cast in a recurring role.

Filming
On January 30, 2019, filming for the series in Chicago, Illinois was shut down due to the 2019 polar vortex.

Release

Marketing
On May 14, 2018, Fox released the first trailer for the series. On January 16, 2019, another trailer was released.

Distribution
In Italy, the series is premiere on February 19, 2019, on Fox Crime. In the United Kingdom, the series was scheduled to premiere in March 2019 on Universal TV.

Reception

Critical response
On the review aggregator website Rotten Tomatoes, the series has an approval rating of 25% based on 16 reviews, with an average rating of 6.12/10. The website's critical consensus reads, "The jury finds Proven Innocent—on the charges of saddling fine actors with clunky dialogue, padding out its storylines with stale plot contrivances, and wasting viewers' time with rote procedural formula—guilty on all counts." Metacritic, which uses a weighted average, assigned a score of 47 out of 100 based on 10 critics, indicating "mixed or average reviews".

Ratings

References

External links
 
 

2010s American drama television series
2010s American legal television series
2019 American television series debuts
2019 American television series endings
American LGBT-related television shows
American legal drama television series
Bisexuality-related television series
Courtroom drama television series
English-language television shows
Fox Broadcasting Company original programming
Television series by 20th Century Fox Television